Grist Mill Road is the second novel by English author Christopher J. Yates published in 2018 by Picador.

Plot 
In 1982, three teenagers are involved in a crime in a forest 90 miles north of New York City. Hannah (the rich daughter of a cement dynasty) is tied to a tree, Matthew shoots her with a Red Ryder BB Gun and she loses an eye. Patrick (Patch) is secretly watching, counting the shots over 40 times, and he thinks that Matthew had killed her. Later Patrick returns and finds that Hannah is still alive, unties her, and brings her back to the town where she is taken to hospital.  Then Matthew is convicted and sent to prison. But Hannah believes Patrick is totally innocent.

In 2008 New York City Patrick is married to Hannah in a luxury apartment looking over Times Square in New York City. Patrick believes he should have prevented Matthews attack on Hannah, for which he feels guilty. He has lost his job at a bank in the depression and now writes a cooking blog. Patrick feels paranoid and depressed then he notices an proposal sent to his blog by an unknown admirer, intrigued by the offer he then meets Matthew, leading to the situation spiralling out of control, pulling Hannah in...

Reception
Publishers Weekly writes that this is "an edgy, intelligent thriller that explores the aftermath of a senseless crime...The reader’s sympathies shift as each character brings a different perspective to the events that shaped them. Unexpected twists keep the tension high.
Kirkus Reviews is also positive: "Much of the book explores the ways in which they individually struggle to come to terms with and exorcise guilt before the past can destroy their present and future happiness. If this sounds complicated, it is—humanly complicated and narratively complicated—but successfully and movingly so. Yates manages to take a brutal incident and, by the end, create understanding for all three major characters involved: the victim, the perpetrator, and the witness. By doing so, he drives home the messages that truth is always subjective and that true, compassionate love is always redemptive. It's the compassion part, he argues, at which most of us tend to fail. Mesmerizing and impossible to put down, this novel demands full attention, full empathy, and full responsibility; in return it offers poignant insight into human fragility and resilience."
Catherine Russell in PopMatters explains that "Grist Mill Road is a complicated story with many layers. The characters are complex, and most of them are wonderfully human (which of course means deeply flawed). The story details too many problems and issues to list—including but certainly not limited to the far reaching impacts of violence. Still, the notion of 'watching' is the idea I keep returning to. In a society where reality television and social media often dominate, where cell phone videos of just about everything appear online, the idea of what it means to watch takes on new meanings. Grist Mill Road is a book that provides ample opportunities to explore what some of these new meanings might be.
Dennis Drabelle from The Washington Post praises Yates: "who was born and raised in England and now lives in New York City, set his first novel, Black Chalk, mostly in his homeland. This time around, he demonstrates impressive knowledge of and affection for his adopted country while telling an even more compelling tale. Not least among his new book's strengths is the light it sheds on the phenomenon of an otherwise law-abiding male giving in to volcanic rage.

References

2018 British novels
Picador (imprint) books
Fiction set in 1982
Fiction set in 2008
Novels set in New York (state)
Headline Publishing Group books